"Watch Over Me" is the third single from Australian rock singer-songwriter, Bernard Fanning's solo debut album Tea and Sympathy, released in June 2006. Fanning has said in the past that the song had been inspired by the music played at the funeral of Pope John Paul II. It reached No. 16 on the ARIA Singles Chart.

Track listing
 "Watch Over Me" — 
 "For You and I" — 
 "Not Finished Just Yet (Max Sessions Live)" —

Charts

References 

Bernard Fanning songs
2006 singles
Song recordings produced by Tchad Blake
2005 songs
Dew Process singles
Song articles with missing songwriters